Wu Yixia (1943 – 14 September 1998) is a Chinese politician who served as governor of Guizhou from 1996 to 1998. He was a representative of the 13th and 15th National Congress of the Chinese Communist Party. He was a member of the 15th Central Committee of the Chinese Communist Party.

Biography
Wu was born Wu Tieyuan in Jilin City, Jilin Province, Manchukuo, in 1943. After university, in 1968, he was assigned to the Beidahuang Farm of a PLA unit to do farm works. 

Wu joined the Chinese Communist Party (CCP) in 1965, and got involved in politics in 1970.  From 1970 to 1982, he worked in both Nong'an County and Jiutai County.  Starting in 1983, he successively served as executive vice mayor, deputy party secretary, and party secretary of Changchun. He was promoted to executive vice governor of Jilin in 1987, concurrently serving as deputy party secretary since 1992.  In April 1993, he was appointed executive vice minister of the Ministry of Agriculture, he remained in that position until June 1996, when he was transferred to southwest China's Guizhou province and appointed deputy party secretary and governor. 

On 14 September 1998, Wu died from liver cancer at the 301 Hospital in Beijing, at the age of 55.

References

1943 births
1998 deaths
People from Jilin City
Jilin Agricultural University alumni
People's Republic of China politicians from Jilin
Chinese Communist Party politicians from Jilin
Governors of Guizhou
Members of the 15th Central Committee of the Chinese Communist Party
Deaths from liver cancer